James Marriott may refer to:

 Sir James Marriott (judge) (1730–1803), British judge, politician and scholar
 James Marriott (author) (1972–2012), English film critic and writer
 James Henry Marriott (1799–1886), New Zealand theatre manager, actor, writer and bookseller